Nagpur South Assembly constituency is one of the 288 Vidhan Sabha (legislative assembly) constituencies of Maharashtra state, western India. It is one of the six assembly seats which make up Nagpur Lok Sabha seat. The Constituency Number is 53. This constituency is located in the Nagpur district. The delimitation of the constituency happened in 2008. It comprises parts of Nagpur Taluka, and Ward No. 9 to 11, 37 to 42, 73 to 78, 99 to 102 and 120 of Nagpur Municipal Corporation.

Members of Vidhan Sabha

^ by-poll

References

Assembly constituencies of Nagpur district
Politics of Nagpur
Assembly constituencies of Maharashtra